Magnolia Creek is a stream in St. Louis County in the U.S. state of Missouri. It is a tributary to Deer Creek.

Magnolia Creek was named for the magnolia trees near its course.

References

Rivers of Missouri
Rivers of St. Louis County, Missouri